Eobarbourula delfinoi is an extinct toad which existed in what is now Gujarat, India, during the Middle Ypresian age of the early Eocene. It was described by Annelise Folie, Rajendra S. Rana, Kenneth D. Rose, Ashok Sahni, Kishor Kumar, Lachham Singh and Thierry Smith in 2012, and is the only species in the genus Eobarbourula. The name of the genus is a combination of "Eo", referring to the epoch in which the animal existed, and Barbourula, the generic name of the jungle toads, while the specific epithet refers to Massimo Delfino, an Italian paleontologist.

References

Bombinatoridae
Eocene amphibians
Fossil taxa described in 2012
Prehistoric amphibians of Asia
Prehistoric amphibian genera